During the 2002–03 English football season, Coventry City F.C. competed in the Football League First Division. It was the club's second consecutive season at that level.

Season summary
In the 2002–03 season, midway through the campaign, McAllister's men still stood a good chance of making the Division One play-offs, but they won only one league game after the turn of 2003 and finished 20th in the final table - just two places above the relegation zone.

Final league table

Results
Coventry City's score comes first

Legend

Football League First Division

FA Cup

League Cup

First-team squad
Squad at end of season

Transfers

Transfers in

Transfers out

Reserve squad

References

Coventry City F.C. seasons
Coventry City